Oto is a given name and surname. As a given name it is related to the name Otto. Notable people with the name include:

Given name
Oto Horvat (born 1967), Serbian poet
Oto Iskandar di Nata (1897–1945), Indonesian freedom fighter
Oto Luthar (born 1959), Slovenian historian
Oto Pestner (born 1956), Slovenian singer and composer
Oto Pustoslemšek (born 1943), Slovenian alpine skier
Oto Seviško (1892–1958), Latvian sprinter

Surname
Michiei Oto, Japanese molecular biologist
Nataniela Oto (born 1980), Tongan-Japanese rugby union player
Razlan Oto (born 1984), Malaysian footballer